Railroad sickness may refer to:

Transport tetany in livestock
Motion sickness in humans

See also
:de:Eisenbahnkrankheit, an obsolete 19th century diagnosis of "railroad sickness", mostly superseded with that of motion sickness